The Great Western Building is a building at Mumbai, the capital of Maharashtra. 

This large and palatial-looking building has served many uses. It was once the residence of the Governor of Bombay. William Hornby, a former governor who was instrumental in initiating the Hornby Vellard project which bunded the breach at Mahalaxmi, lived here for a few years of his term in office. It also served as the Admiralty House, residence of the Commander-in-chief of the Indian Fleet from 1770–1795.

Lachlan Macquarie, who was later the Governor of New South Wales (1810-1821), lived at Admiralty House. He records in his journal for 23 April 1794 that – 'Mr. Tasker having been so obliging to give us a friendly invitation to live in his town house (Admiralty House), during the hot weather and while he should remain in the country, (where he lives at present) we accepted of his offer'.
Around 1800, it was purchased by the Government and transformed into The Recorders Court until 1878. The original porch was removed when the street was widened. The property was purchased by Rustomjee Jeejeebhoy and then sold to the Sassoon family.

In 1883, it was sold again and converted into a hotel known as the Great Western Hotel. A new five-storied wing was added in the early 1890s. It was designed by renowned architect S. M. N. Chandabhoy who also designed another smaller three-storied building in the later 1890s.

In time, the hotel closed and the rooms have been divided and further subdivided for optimum rental.

References

https://www.mq.edu.au/macquarie-archive/lema/1794/1794april.html

Buildings and structures in Mumbai